Michael Taiaroa (born 3 July 1988) is a New Zealand cricketer. He played in one first-class match for Central Districts in 2008.

See also
 List of Central Districts representative cricketers

References

External links
 

1988 births
Living people
New Zealand cricketers
Central Districts cricketers
Cricketers from Hastings, New Zealand